A national qualifications framework (NQF) is a formal system describing qualifications. 47 countries participating in the Bologna Process are committed to producing a national qualifications framework. Other countries not part of this process also have national qualifications frameworks.

Qualifications framework 

A qualifications framework is a formalized structure in which learning level descriptors and qualifications are used in order to understand learning outcomes. This allows for the ability to develop, assess and improve quality education in a number of contexts. Qualifications frameworks are typically found at the national, regional, and international level. Therefore, a national qualifications framework is one type of qualifications framework.

Australia 

The Australian Qualifications Framework is the national qualifications framework in Australia.

Barbados 

National/Caribbean Vocational Qualifications (N/CVQ) are awarded by the Technical and Vocational Education and Training Council (TVET). N/CVQs are work-related and competency-based. Training for the qualifications can be earned from the Samuel Jackman Prescod Polytechnic, the Barbados Vocational Training Board, or the National Initiative for Service Excellence. Standards for the qualifications are drawn up by industry experts and qualifications are only awarded where the trainee can demonstrate the ability to meet these standards to certified assessors. There are five levels - level 1 (entry level occupations), level 2 (skilled occupations), level 3 (technical, skilled, and supervisory occupations), level 4 (technical specialist and middle management occupations), and level 5 (chartered, professional, and senior management occupations).

Caribbean region 

Regional accreditation bodies are planned to assess qualifications for equivalency, complementary to the free movement of persons. To this end, the member states have concluded the Agreement on Accreditation for Education in Medical and other Health Professions. By this agreement, an authority (the Caribbean Accreditation Authority for Education in Medical and Other Health Professions) is established which will be responsible for accrediting doctors and other health care personnel throughout the CSME. The authority will be headquartered in Jamaica, which is one of among six states (Antigua and Barbuda, Belize, Jamaica, Suriname, Trinidad and Tobago) in which agreement is already in force. The Bahamas has also signed on to the agreement.

Region-wide accreditation has also been planned for vocational skills. Currently local training agencies award National Vocational Qualifications (NVQ) or national Technical and Vocational Education and Training (TVET) certification, which are not valid across Member States. However, in 2003, the Caribbean Association of National Agencies (CANTA) was formed as an umbrella organization of the various local training agencies including Trinidad and Tobago's National Training Agency, the Barbados TVET Council and the Organisation of Eastern Caribbean States TVET agency and the HEART Trust/NTA of Jamaica. Since 2005, the member organizations of CANTA have been working together to ensure a uniformed level of certified skilled labour under the Caricom Single Market and Economy (CSME) and CANTA itself has established a regional certification scheme that awards the Caribbean Vocational Qualification (CVQ), which is to replace NVQs and national TVET certifications. The CVQ will be school-based and although based on the certification scheme of CANTA, will be awarded by the Caribbean Examinations Council (CXC) which will be collaborating with CANTA on the CVQ programme. At the February 9–10, 2007 meeting of the Regional Coordinating Mechanism for Technical and Vocational Education and Training, officials discussed arrangements for the award of the CVQ which was approved by the Council for Human and Social Development (COHSOD) in October 2006. It was expected that the CVQ programme may be in place by mid-2007, if all the requirements are met and that provisions were being made for the holders of current NVQs to have them converted into the regionally accepted type (although no clear mandate is yet in place). This deadline was met and in October 2007, the CVQ programme was officially launched. The CVQ now facilitates the movement of artisans and other skilled persons in the CSME. This qualification will be accessible to persons already in the workforce as well as students in secondary schools across the Caribbean region. Those already in the work force will be required to attend designated centres for assessment.

The CVQ  is based on a competency-based approach to training, assessment and certification. Candidates are expected to demonstrate competence in attaining occupational standards developed by practitioners, industry experts and employers. Those standards when approved by CARICOM allow for portability across the Region. Currently, CVQs are planned to reflect a Qualification framework of five levels. These are:

 Level 1: Directly Supervised/Entry –Level Worker
 Level 2: Supervised Skilled Worker
 Level 3: Independent or Autonomous Skilled Worker
 Level 4: Specialized or Supervisory Worker
 Level 5: Managerial and/or Professional Worker

CVQ’s are awarded to those candidates who would have met the required standards in all of the prescribed units of study. Statements are issued in cases where candidates did not complete all the requirements for the award of CVQ. Schools that are suitably equipped currently offer Levels 1 & 2.

By March 2012 up to 2,263 CVQs had been awarded in the workforce across the region and 2,872 had been awarded in schools for a total of 5,135 CVQs awarded up to that time. The breakdown of the agency awarding the over 5,000 CVQs by March 2012 stood at 1,680 having been awarded by the CXC and 3,455 being awarded by the various National Training Agencies (with some being awarded in the workplace and some being awarded in secondary schools).

Sources
 JIS website on the CSME
 SICE - Establishment of the CSME

South Africa

United Kingdom

The current national qualifications frameworks in the UK are: 
 England: Regulated Qualifications Framework (RQF) for general and vocational qualifications regulated by Ofqual 
 Northern Ireland: Council for the Curriculum, Examinations and Assessment (CCEA)
 Wales: Credit and Qualifications Framework for Wales (CQFW) for all qualifications.
 Scotland: Scottish Credit and Qualifications Framework (SCQF) for all qualifications.

The Frameworks for Higher Education Qualifications of UK Degree Awarding Bodies (FHEQ) for qualifications awarded by bodies across the United Kingdom with degree-awarding powers.

India
 

India's National Skill Development Agency (NSDA)'s National Skills Qualification Framework (NSQF), is a quality assurance framework which grades and recognises levels of skill based on the learning outcomes acquired through both formal or informal means. 

Indian Education System recognises the following:
RPL: Recognition of Prior Learning, NCWP: National Certificate for Work Preparation, NCC: National Competency Certificate

Ireland 

The National Framework of Qualifications is the framework used in Ireland.

Kenya 

In December 2014 the Parliament of Kenya passed the Kenya National Qualifications Framework Act to establish a "national system for the articulation, classification, registration, quality assurance, and the monitoring and evaluation of national qualifications".

New Zealand 

The New Zealand Qualifications Framework, administered by the New Zealand Qualifications Authority, covers qualifications in secondary and tertiary education in New Zealand.

Sources

References

Educational qualifications in the United Kingdom
Academic transfer